Sunrise Weather (stylized as sunriseWEATHER) was an early morning weekend program that aired on The Weather Channel from September 2008 to November 2013. Its emphasis was on straightforward forecasts. The program aired for a half-hour on weekend mornings from 4:30am-5am ET, and had the shortest runtime of any forecast program on the network. It was also the lowest viewed show on TWC since it was shown at a very early time and on a weekend.

Sunrise Weather launched on September 20, 2008, replacing the first half hour of the now defunct Weekend Outlook. It placed more emphasis on hard weather forecasts than most other TWC shows. When the show launched, Ray Stagich co-anchored with Mike Seidel on Saturdays and Alex Wallace on Sundays.

In September 2009, Seidel left to cover College/NFL games for TWC, and was replaced by Jeff Morrow.

In July 2012, Wallace left for First Outlook, and was replaced by Danielle Banks.

In October 2012, Morrow left TWC. Banks and Stagich started anchoring both Saturday and Sunday together until November 2013, when Banks left for Weekend Now and Weather Center Live, and was not replaced. The show was hosted by meteorologist Ray Stagich solely.

If there was a major weather event, Sunrise Weather would be pre-empted by an extended edition of Weekend View.

The final broadcast of Sunrise Weather aired on November 11, 2013. It has since been replaced by the new all-day Weather Center Live program, which was part of the 2013 relaunch of the Weather Channel.

References

The Weather Channel original programming
2008 American television series debuts
2010s American television series
English-language television shows